Babble Royale is a free-to-play battle royale video game developed by designers James Lantz and Frank Lantz of Everybody House Games. It was released for Windows and macOS in early access on December 15, 2021, via Steam. In each match, up to 16 players land on a gridded board, starting as one tile, and form English-language words similarly to the board game Scrabble. Players can eliminate each other by connecting their words to opponents, and a "hot zone" closes in to shrink the board, dealing damage to players within.

References 

2021 video games
Battle royale games
Digital board games
Free-to-play video games
MacOS games
Video games developed in the United States

Windows games
Word puzzle video games